Mokaria-Yamoleka Airport  is an airstrip serving Mokaria-Yamoleka, a village Mongala Province, Democratic Republic of the Congo. The airstrip is along the road south of the village

See also

Transport in the Democratic Republic of the Congo
List of airports in the Democratic Republic of the Congo

References

External links
OpenStreetMap - Mokaria-Yamoleka
OurAirports - Mokaria-Yamoleka
FallingRain - Mokaria-Yamoleka Airport

Airports in Tshopo
Airports in Mongala